Sefa Akgün (born 30 June 2000) is a Turkish professional footballer who plays as a midfielder for Erzurumspor.

Professional career
A youth product of Trabzonspor, signed with Erzurumspor F.K. on 4 July 2018. Akgün made his professional debut with Erzurumspor F.K. in a 2-0 Süper Lig win over Kayserispor on 26 May 2019.

International career
Akgün represented the Turkey U17s at the 2017 UEFA European Under-17 Championship and 2017 FIFA U-17 World Cup.

References

External links
 
 
 

2000 births
People from Araklı
Living people
Turkish footballers
Turkey youth international footballers
Association football midfielders
Büyükşehir Belediye Erzurumspor footballers
24 Erzincanspor footballers
Süper Lig players
TFF First League players
TFF Second League players